Sebastian Mützel (born 9 August 1989) is a German footballer who plays for TuS Bövinghausen.

External links
 
 

1989 births
Living people
Association football forwards
German footballers
3. Liga players
Regionalliga players
Oberliga (football) players
SpVgg Unterhaching players
1. FC Nürnberg II players
Rot-Weiß Oberhausen players
SpVgg Unterhaching II players
SC Westfalia Herne players
Rot Weiss Ahlen players
People from Bad Tölz
Sportspeople from Upper Bavaria
Footballers from Bavaria